Henry Burrans Graham, STD ( 29 August 1905 – 20 August 1979) was an English Anglican priest.

Early life
The 2nd son of William and Elizabeth Turnbull, he was educated at King James's School, Almondbury Durham University and Ripon College, Wisconsin.

Religious life
 Ordained,  1939
 Curate of Hitcham, Suffolk, 1939–41
 Chaplain RAF Wattisham, 1939–41
 St Edmundsbury and Ipswich Diocesan Secretary 1941–54
 Canon Residentiary of Ripon Cathedral, 1954–61
 Archdeacon of Richmond, 1954–61 to 1976.
 Vicar Blackawton, Devon 1961-63

Death

Graham died on 4 July 1963.

References

1909 births
Archdeacons of Richmond
People educated at King James's School, Almondbury
Alumni of Durham University
Ripon College (Wisconsin) alumni
1979 deaths
Royal Air Force chaplains